Wiang Chai is a district (amphoe) in the central part of Chiang Rai province, northern Thailand.

Geography
Neighboring districts are (from the west clockwise): Mueang Chiang Rai, Wiang Chiang Rung, Phaya Mengrai, and Thoeng of Chiang Rai Province.

The important water resource is the Kok River.

History
The minor district (king amphoe) was created on 17 June 1974, when the three tambons Wiang Chai, Thung Ko, and Pha Ngam were split off from Mueang Chiang Rai district.
 It was upgraded to a full district on 25 March 1979.

Administration
The district is divided into five sub-districts (tambons), which are further subdivided into 75 villages (mubans). The township (thesaban tambon) Wiang Chai covers parts of tambons Wiang Chai and Mueang Chum. There are a further five tambon administrative organizations (TAO).

Missing numbers are tambons which now form Wiang Chiang Rung District.

References

External links

amphoe.com

Wiang Chai